Bishopstown Community School is a secondary school in the Bishopstown area of Cork city in Ireland. Established in 1979, it is the only co-educational secondary school in the area.

Past pupils of the school include members of the band The Frank and Walters.

In 2015 Bishopstown Community School was awarded the amber flag for the work of its students and staff in promoting positive mental health. In addition to this the school has produced a number of publications in this area.

References

External links
 

Secondary schools in County Cork
Community schools in the Republic of Ireland
1979 establishments in Ireland
Educational institutions established in 1979